Killerby may refer to:

 Killerby, County Durham, England
 Killerby, North Yorkshire, England
 Killerby, a hamlet in the Borough of Scarborough, England